Daily News is a Thai-language daily newspaper published in Bangkok and distributed nationwide. It is the 2nd best-selling newspaper in Thailand. It has a circulation in excess of 850,000 copies daily.

History
Daily News was founded by  when he purchased the defunct  newspaper (Thai edition of the Bangkok Daily Mail) which has ceased publication in 1932 and relunched it as Daily Mail Monday it was first published weakly than as a daily. Daily Mail Monday was forced to close down in 1958. 

It was refouned as Naewna Hang Yuk Daily News in 1964 and later shortened it name to just Daily News in 1979.

Footnotes

References

External links
History of Daily News 
About Daily News

Newspapers published in Thailand
Publications established in 1964
1964 establishments in Thailand
Thai-language newspapers